Hendrit Ferra (born 13 January 1989) is an Albanian football player who last played for Dinamo Tirana in Albanian First Division as a striker.

Club career

KF Tirana

Ferra made his league debut for KF Tirana on 21 March 2009 during the match with Apolonia Fier. The 20-year-old striker came on for goalscorer Devis Mukaj on the 84th minute of the game.

Teuta Durrës

Ferra was loaned out to fellow Albanian Superliga side in order to get more first team action and to gain experience. His loan deal is due to expire at the end of the 2009–10 season on 31 May 2010.

References

1989 births
Living people
Footballers from Tirana
Albanian footballers
Association football forwards
KF Tirana players
KF Teuta Durrës players
KF Elbasani players
KF Laçi players
FK Dinamo Tirana players
Kategoria Superiore players
Kategoria e Parë players